Circus of Chaos is an album by Clown Alley, released in 1985 through Alchemy Records (VM101). It was re-released by Southern Lord Records in 2006.

Band members Mark Deutrom and Lori Black both went on to become members of seminal grunge band Melvins, though at different times.

Track listing
"The Lie"
"Unplugged"
"In the Cartoon"
"On the Way Up"
"Uranium Miner's Daughter"
"Pet of a Pig"
"The Grey Men"
"Envy"
"Theme"
"The Second Day"
"The Prey"

Personnel
David Duran - vocals
Mark Deutrom - guitar
Lori Black - bass guitar
Justin Clayton - drums

References

1985 debut albums
Clown Alley (band) albums
Southern Lord Records albums
Alchemy Records (U.S.) albums